Wadi al-Uyun Subdistrict  is a Syrian nahiyah (subdistrict) located in Masyaf District in Hama.  According to the Syria Central Bureau of Statistics (CBS), Wadi al-Uyun Subdistrict had a population of 12951 in the 2004 census.

Localities of the subdistrict
The following villages make up Wadi al-'Uyun Subdistrict.

Wadi al-Uyun    3,371
Birat al-Jurd 1,670
Qussiyah    645
Jabita     687
Tamarqiyah    607
Duwayr al-Mashayekh 692
Sindiyana    621
Bayt Raqata    265
Ammuriyah    402
Ayn al-Karam   564
Kamaliyah    532
Kafr Laha, Hama    379
Ayn Farraj    190
Bashawi    253
Braize     196
Bayt al-Wadi    157
Ayn al-Bayda    319
Zaytuneh    304
Maysara    330
Naqir     389
Marha            378

References 

Wadi al-Uyun
Masyaf District